Irene Pivetti (born 4 April 1963 in Milan) is an Italian journalist, television presenter and politician. She has been President of the Italian Chamber of Deputies from 1994 to 1996. After leaving politics, she started a career in television, like her sister Veronica, a popular Italian actress.

Biography 
She is the daughter of director Paolo Pivetti and actress Grazia Gabrielli, sister of the actress, presenter and director Veronica Pivetti, and granddaughter of the linguist Aldo Gabrielli (maternal grandfather). She graduated with honors in literature (philosophical address) at the Catholic University of the Sacred Heart of Milan; after the degree she worked as an editorial consultant. Between 1987 and 1990 he edited volumes on the Italian language for Motta Editore, Selezione, Mondadori, Club degli Editori, De Agostini. She was married two times: before with Paolo Taranta (marriage annulled by the Roman Rota, on her appeal) and then with Alberto Brambilla, from which she had two children and from whom she subsequently divorced.

From 1990 to 1994 she was in charge of the Catholic Council of the Lombard League, which later became Northern League. In 1992 she was elected MP, and she was reconfirmed in 1994.

On 15 April 1994, at the fourth ballot, she was elected President of the Chamber of Deputies: at 31 she was the youngest president of the Chamber of Italian History.

In the 1996 election she was re-elected MP, but on 12 September 1996 she was expelled from the Northern League for her opposition to the line of the Padanian secessionism; thus on 22 October 1996 she founded the Federal Italy movement, which merged into the Italian Renewal in 1998. In 1999 Irene Pivetti joined the UDEUR, of which she was president from 23 May 1999 until 2002.

In 2009 she was appointed councilor for work and vocational training in the municipality of Berceto (Province of Parma), while in August 2010 she was appointed image commissioner in the municipality of Reggio Calabria.

In the 2013 regional elections of Lazio she ran among the ranks of the Christian Populars, without being elected; in 2016 she was a candidate in the municipal elections of Rome among the ranks of Us with Salvini, also in this case without being elected. In the 2019 European election she has been a candidate to the European Parliament on the Forza Italia list.

In April 2020 the Prosecutor Offices of Rome, Savona, Siracusa and Imperia started an investigation on her due to trafficking of non-compliant masks from China.
In June 2020 the Prosecutor Office of Milan started another investigation on her due to money-laundering. These investigations are related to her activities during the COVID-19 pandemic.

In November 2021 the Economic and Financial Police Unit of the Guardia di Finanza of Milan carried out a preventive seizure of 4 million euros against her and one of her consultants, among the suspects in an investigation that focuses on a series of commercial transactions, in particular, the purchase and sale of three Ferrari, which would have been used to 'clean up' the proceeds of tax evasion. The sum was then released.

Electoral history

First-past-the-post elections

References

External links
Personal website
Interview

1963 births
Living people
Mass media people from Milan
Italian Roman Catholics
Lega Nord politicians
Presidents of the Chamber of Deputies (Italy)
Deputies of Legislature XI of Italy
Deputies of Legislature XII of Italy
Deputies of Legislature XIII of Italy
Politicians from Milan
Journalists from Milan
20th-century Italian women politicians
Women legislative speakers
Università Cattolica del Sacro Cuore alumni
21st-century Italian women
Women members of the Chamber of Deputies (Italy)